The Hollister Free Lance is an American weekly newspaper published in Hollister, California and distributed in San Benito County, California.

Early history
J. McGonigle founded The Free Lance as the Hollister Enterprise on October 18, 1873. On December 10, 1886, W.B. Winn began publishing under the Free Lance nameplate. After eight years of publishing in Hollister, Winn sold the newspaper in February 1891 to J. L. Lahiff and moved to San Francisco. The Free Lance merged with the Hesperian. 

Lahiff was city editor, and business partner Robert P. Stephenson served as editor. "The  paper is enthusiastically and aggressively Republican in politics," an 1893 author wrote. Printer James Piratsky acquired a 50 percent interest in the newspaper around that time. The Hollister newspaper market was a competitive one. In 1921, the publisher of the Free Lance, which claimed a circulation of 1,019, placed an ad in Editor and Publisher, a trade magazine, offering a $250 reward to anyone who could produce proof that the Morning Daily Advance of Hollister published more than 1,026 copies.

Corporate Ownership
McClatchy Newspapers purchased the Free Lance in 1981. On February 28, 1997, McClatchy sold the Dispatch, along with the Hollister Free Lance, the Morgan Hill Times and the Amador Ledger to Independent Newspapers Ltd. of New Zealand. Independent's largest shareholder was Australia-based News Ltd., controlled by publisher Rupert Murdoch. The New Zealand group sold the papers in 1998 to Central Valley Publishing Holdings, Inc., an operator of 30 small-market papers that was based in Festus, Missouri.

Purchase of The Pinnacle
At the end of 2003, Mainstreet Media, a company formed by Central Valley Publishing executives and backed by private equity funding, acquired the publishing group. A year later, the group acquired its competitor, The Pinnacle, from Tracie Cone and Anna Marie dos Remedios, who had purchased The Pinnacle in 1999. Cone retired from the Pinnacle in 2005 and in 2006 ran unsuccessfully for San Benito County supervisor.
The Pinnacle nameplate was retired in 2013.
The same year, Mainstreet’s controlling shareholder, The Brookside Group of Stamford, CT, put its California newspapers on the market.

Current Ownership
In April 2014, the Hollister Free Lance returned to ownership by a Northern California publisher with its purchase by New SV Media Inc., a subsidiary of Metro Newspapers of San Jose, California.
In October 2014, Metro’s CEO began to move the paper away from its alignment with petroleum drilling interests and attacks on environmentalists, publicly separating itself from a $1.9 million oil company-funded political campaign in opposition to San Benito County Measure J that heavily featured the Free Lance’s logo and quotes from an opinion piece by its former editorial board.

Coverage
The paper’s coverage and circulation are concentrated on the  San Benito County, including Hollister and San Juan Bautista.

San Benito Magazine
On July 15, 2016, the Free Lance launched and began distributing San Benito magazine inside each issue. The full color magazine replaced the Free Lance’s former “Lifestyles” section. In 2020, the magazine was upgraded to glossy stock.

Awards

The Free Lance has won many awards from the California Newspaper Publishers Association for its editorial work. The Free Lance and Pinnacle together won seven CNPA awards in 2011. It won first place in investigative or enterprise reporting, for Connor Ramey, Kollin Kosmicki and Marty Richman's stories on the 2010 San Benito County sheriff's race; first place in breaking news, for coverage of the Pentagon shooting involving a Hollister resident, by Adam Breen, Melissa Flores, Andrew Matheson, Lora Schraft and Kosmicki; first place in the sports photo category for Nick Lovejoy's coverage of San Benito High School sports; second place in the sports photo category, also for Lovejoy's coverage of local sports; second place in online breaking news for coverage of the Pentagon shooting involving a Hollister resident, by Breen, Flores, Matheson, Schraft and Kosmicki. The Pinnacle competed against other weekly newspapers with a circulation of 11,001 to 25,000. It won in the following categories: second place for a breaking news photo by Lovejoy while covering the Eagle Recycling fire; second place for a sports photo by Lovejoy involving cross-country.

The prior year, in 2010, the newspaper also captured six awards – for photography, sports and investigative reporting.

The Free Lance won seven CNPA awards in the 2015 Better Newspapers Contest. Sports Editor Emanuel Lee won first place for the Free Lance’s sports coverage. Second-place awards were given for photography and columns, and blue ribbons were awarded for agriculture reporting, sports feature and lifestyle coverage.

Under editor Barry Holtzclaw, the Free Lance won two 2017 CNPA first place awards for “Enterprise News Story” and “Editorial Comment” and one second place award for “Editorial Comment” for pieces on the disappearance of funds in a charitable trust managed by school board member Mitchell Dabo.

References 

Newspapers established in 1866
Weekly newspapers published in California
1866 establishments in California